The siege of Palermo took place between 27 and 30 May 1860 in Palermo, Sicily, during the Expedition of the Thousand led by Giuseppe Garibaldi against the Kingdom of the Two Sicilies, as part of the Italian unification wars.

Battle
Although with only about 750 Redshirts able to fight, along with some 3,000 picciotti (Sicilian volunteer guerrillas), on 27 May Garibaldi attacked the Sicilian capital of Palermo, held by a garrison of 18,000 to 22,000 Bourbon Army soldiers under the incompetent command of General Ferdinando Lanza. A significant portion of the 180,000 residents of Palermo rallied to Garibaldi, including about 2,000 prisoners released from local jails. On the first day of fighting, Bourbon forces were driven back from a number of key positions. Lanza then ordered the shelling of the part of the city that had been captured by Garibaldi's forces, causing the death of around 600 civilians until the end of the siege.

By May 28, Garibaldi controlled much of Palermo, and the next day his volunteers repelled a counterattack. However, with the arrival of two battalions of well-trained Bavarian mercenaries in the service of the Bourbon government, the battle turned against Garibaldi, whose troops were nearly out of ammunition. Nevertheless, Lanza surrendered the city on 30 May. Garibaldi sent his son Menotti to watch the surrender of the Bourbon garrison, and an armistice was quickly reached with the mediation of British admiral Rodney Mundy. Finally, a convention on 6 June arranged for the withdrawal by sea of about 22,000 Bourbon troops, on 19 June.

Gallery

Citations

References

Battles of the Expedition of the Thousand
History of Palermo
Palermo
May 1860 events
1860 in Italy
Sieges of the 19th century